In mathematics, a square-difference-free set is a set of natural numbers, no two of which differ by a square number. Hillel Furstenberg and András Sárközy proved in the late 1970s the Furstenberg–Sárközy theorem of additive number theory showing that, in a certain sense, these sets cannot be very large. In the game of subtract a square, the positions where the next player loses form a square-difference-free set. Another square-difference-free set is obtained by doubling the Moser–de Bruijn sequence.

Closing the gap between these upper and lower bounds remains an open problem. The sublinear size bounds on square-difference-free sets can be generalized to sets where certain other polynomials are forbidden as differences between pairs of elements.

Example
An example of a set with no square differences arises in the game of subtract a square, invented by Richard A. Epstein and first described in 1966 by Solomon W. Golomb. In this game, two players take turns removing coins from a pile of coins; the player who removes the last coin wins. In each turn, the player can only remove a nonzero square number of coins from the pile. Any position in this game can be described by an integer, its number of coins.
The non-negative integers can be partitioned into "cold" positions, in which the player who is about to move is losing, and "hot" positions, in which the player who is about to move can win by moving to a cold position. No two cold positions can differ by a square, because if they did then a player faced with the larger of the two positions could move to the smaller position and win. Thus, the cold positions form a set with no square difference:

Numerical evidence suggests that the actual number of cold positions  is

Upper bounds
Equivalently, every set of natural numbers with positive upper density contains two numbers whose difference is a square, and more strongly contains infinitely many such pairs. The Furstenberg–Sárközy theorem was conjectured by László Lovász, and proved independently in the late 1970s by Hillel Furstenberg and András Sárközy, after whom it is named. Since their work, several other proofs of the same result have been published, generally either simplifying the previous proofs or strengthening the bounds on how sparse a square-difference-free set must be. The best upper bound currently known is due to Thomas Bloom and James Maynard, who show that a square-difference-free set can include at most

Most of these proofs that establish quantitative upper bounds use Fourier analysis or ergodic theory, although neither is necessary to prove the weaker result that every square-difference-free set has zero density.

Lower bounds
Paul Erdős conjectured that every square-difference-free set has

Sárközy weakened Erdős's conjecture to suggest that, for every , every square-difference-free set has

This, in turn, was disproved by Imre Z. Ruzsa, who found square-difference-free sets with up to

elements.

The digits in odd positions of these numbers can be arbitrary. Ruzsa found the seven-element set  modulo , giving the stated bound.
Subsequently, Ruzsa's construction has been improved by using a different base, to give square-difference-free sets with size

When applied to the base , the same construction generates the Moser–de Bruijn sequence multiplied by two, a square-difference-free set of  elements. This is too sparse to provide nontrivial lower bounds on the Furstenberg–Sárközy theorem but the same sequence has other notable mathematical properties.

Based on these results, it has been conjectured that for every 
That is, if this conjecture is true, the exponent of one in the upper bounds for the Furstenberg–Sárközy theorem cannot be lowered.
As an alternative possibility, the exponent 3/4 has been identified as "a natural limitation to Ruzsa's construction" and another candidate for the true maximum growth rate of these sets.

Generalization to other polynomials
the values at integers of a polynomial  with integer coefficients, as long as the values of  include an integer multiple of every integer.

References

Additive number theory